Maysville Historic District may refer to:

Maysville Historic District (Mobile, Alabama), listed on the National Register of Historic Places (NRHP)
Maysville Historic District (Maysville, Georgia), listed on the NRHP in Banks and Jackson counties

See also
Mayesville Historic District, Mayesville, South Carolina, listed on the NRHP in Sumter County